WANF-LD (channel 32) is a low-power television station in Dyersburg, Tennessee, United States. Owned by Gray Television, it is a translator of WMC-TV (channel 5), the NBC affiliate in Memphis. The transmitter is located on Perciful Road off SR 182 near the I-155/US 412 interchange west of Dyersburg.

Prior to 2020, the station broadcast to Jackson, Tennessee, which remained its nominal city of license until January 2023, on channel 20. It carried national digital multicast networks. Gray acquired it from HC2 Holdings in 2020 and relocated it away from Jackson due to interference issues and to reduce the loss area from the planned conversion of WMC-TV to the UHF band in Dyersburg.

History 
The station's construction permit was granted on February 22, 2011, under the ownership of local businesswoman Sarah W. Stopford. Stopford would sell the still-unbuilt W20DJ-D in 2015 to DTV America, who would sign the station on a year later in January 2016 as WHJK-LD. The station would sign on as an affiliate of Escape (now Ion Mystery) and Laff until 2020.

WHJK and WYJJ-LD were two of several dozen DTV America stations that would be purchased by HC2 Holdings in October 2017.

It was announced in 2020 that Gray Television would be acquiring WHJK-LD from HC2 Holdings. The process would be finalized on July 30, 2020; on August 1, the station would be taken silent and go off the air while Gray finalizes future plans for the station. Gray relocated the facility to channel 32 from a site northwest of Jackson due to interference from adjacent-channel WJKT (channel 21).

In its present Dyersburg configuration, WANF-LD is one of three such low-power TV stations set up by Gray to reduce the loss area in its proposed conversion of WMC-TV from VHF channel 5 to UHF channel 30. The others are W20DW-D covering Clarksdale, Mississippi, and Helena, Arkansas, and WDDY-LD (channel 15), which—while nominally licensed to Jackson—covers Corinth, Mississippi.

Subchannels
This station rebroadcasts the subchannels of WMC-TV in Memphis.

Notes

References

Gray Television
ANF-LD
Television channels and stations established in 2016
Low-power television stations in the United States
NBC network affiliates
Bounce TV affiliates
Circle (TV network) affiliates
Grit (TV network) affiliates
Court TV affiliates